Greek Unity is a minor Greek nationalist political party.

It is led by Vasileios (also Vasilis) Protopapas, one-time president of the Movement for the Release of Army Officers (which campaigns for the release of the 1967-1975 Junta participants from prison, and vice-president of the Panhellenic Association of Combatants and Friends of the National Resistance Organisation 'X'.

It contested the 2009 European Parliament elections in Greece. The first name on the party list was Nikolaos Dertilis, a former army officer convicted of the murder of a student, Michail Myrogiannis, during the Athens Polytechnic uprising.

As Dertilis remains in prison and did not sign his nomination papers, on 24 May 2009 Greece's supreme court rejected his candidacy. Despite this disqualification, his name appeared on the printed ballot papers on polling day.

Electoral results

References

Far-right political parties in Greece